Beaulieu is a small village located on the southeastern edge of the New Forest national park in Hampshire, England, and home to both Palace House and the British National Motor Museum.

History 

The name Beaulieu comes etymologically from French beau lieu, which means "beautiful place". It is derived from Beaulieu Abbey which was populated by 30 monks sent from the abbey of Cîteaux in France, the mother house of the Cistercian order. The medieval Latin name of the monastery was Bellus Locus Regis ("The beautiful place of the king"') or monasterium Belli loci Regis.

During the Second World War, the Beaulieu Estate of Lord Montagu in the New Forest area was the site of group B finishing schools for agents operated by the Special Operations Executive (SOE) between 1941 and 1945. (One of the trainers was Kim Philby who was later found to be part of a spy ring passing information to the Soviets). In 2005, a special exhibition was installed at the Beaulieu Estate, with a video showing photographs from that era as well as voice recordings of former SOE trainers and agents.

The village has remained largely unspoilt by progress, and is a favourite tourist stop for visitors to the New Forest, and also for birdwatchers seeking local specialities like Dartford warbler, European honey buzzard and hobby.

Palace House was featured in the 2005 comedy-drama film Mrs Palfrey at the Claremont starring Joan Plowright and Rupert Friend.

The village was rated as among the "20 most beautiful villages in the UK and Ireland" by Condé Nast Traveler in 2020.

Transport 

While previously this station had an infrequent service, there are now some 20 trains a day stopping here.

Wilts & Dorset bus service 112 serves the village on its way between Hythe and Lymington. In summer, Beaulieu is served by the New Forest Tour, an hourly open-top bus service.

Palace House 

Palace House (not to be confused with the Palace of Beaulieu in Essex), which overlooks the village from across Beaulieu River, began in 1204 as the gatehouse to Beaulieu Abbey, and has been the ancestral home of a branch of the Montagu family since 1538, when was seized from the monks by the Crown in  Henry VIII's Dissolution of the Monasteries and then sold on.

The house was extended in the 16th century, and again in the 19th century, and is today a fine example of a Gothic country house.

Although still home to the current Lord and Lady Montagu, parts of the house and gardens are open daily to the public. It is a member of the Treasure Houses of England consortium.

Museum 

The village is also home to the British National Motor Museum.

The museum was opened in 1952 as the Montagu Motor Museum and became a charitable trust in 1972.  It contains an important collection of historic motor vehicles, including four world land speed record holders:
 Sir Malcolm Campbell's 1920 Sunbeam 350hp
 His son Donald Campbell's 1961 Bluebird-Proteus CN7
 The 1927 Sunbeam 1000hp (the first motor car to reach )
 The 1929 Irving-Napier Special 'Golden Arrow'.

The last two were both driven by Major Henry Segrave.

Beaulieu Jazz Festival 

In the late 1950s Beaulieu was the surprising location for one of Britain's first experiments in pop festival culture, with the annual Beaulieu Jazz Festival, which quickly expanded to become a significant event in the burgeoning jazz and youth pop music scene of the period.

Camping overnight, a rural invasion, eccentric dress, wild music and sometimes wilder behaviour — these now familiar features of pop festivals happened at Beaulieu each summer, culminating in the so-called 'Battle of Beaulieu' at the 1960 festival, when rival gangs of modern and traditional jazz fans indulged in a spot of what sociologists went on to call 'subcultural contestation'.

See also
List of jazz festivals
List of historic rock festivals

References

Bibliography 
 Lord Montagu of Beaulieu (2000) Wheels Within Wheels: An Unconventional Life. London: Weidenfeld and  Nicolson.
 George McKay (2004) '"Unsafe things like youth and jazz": Beaulieu Jazz Festivals (1956–61) and the origins of pop festival  culture in Britain'. In Andy Bennett, ed. Remembering Woodstock (Aldershot: Ashgate).
 George McKay (2005) Circular Breathing: The Cultural Politics of Jazz in Britain, chapter one 'New Orleans jazz, protest (Aldermaston) and carnival (Beaulieu [Jazz Festival 1956-61])'. Durham NC: Duke University Press.

External links 

Villages in Hampshire
Tourist attractions in Hampshire
New Forest District